Radiotherapy & Oncology is a peer-reviewed medical journal in the field of radiation oncology. Commonly referred to as "The Green Journal", it is published by Elsevier on behalf of the European Society for Radiation Oncology (ESTRO).

References

Oncology journals
Elsevier academic journals
Radiation therapy